Mostyn railway station was located roughly  north west of Mostyn, a village in Flintshire, Wales.

History
Situated on the A548 it was opened on 1 May 1848 as part of the Chester and Holyhead Railway (now the North Wales Coast Line). On 1 January 1859 ownership of the line and station passed into the hands of the London and North Western Railway and in 1923 it became part of the London, Midland & Scottish Railway (LMS) until nationalisation in 1948 and the creation of British Railways (London Midland Region), from 1965 rebranded British Rail.

There were originally two platforms to serve the two lines running through the station. In the late 19th century the number of lines were doubled. One platform was changed to an island platform and a further platform constructed, giving a total of four. A footbridge over the lines linked them together. The main station building was a brick built in Itiianate style and was supplemented by a goods shed in the sidings which served the quay. A signal box, built in 1902, was located at the south-east end of the site and is now Grade II Listed Building.

Closure
Steady decline in the mid-20th century meant that it closed for goods services on 4 May 1964 and the station closed fully on 14 February 1966. In the 1980s the line reverted to double track and in the 1990s the footbridge was removed. The station building itself is still in existence as a private dwelling and the goods shed can still be seen.

References

Further reading

External links
 Signalling Record Society - Track and signalling diagram of Mostyn station

Disused railway stations in Flintshire
Former London and North Western Railway stations
Railway stations in Great Britain opened in 1848
Railway stations in Great Britain closed in 1966
Beeching closures in Wales